Gol Sefid or Gel Sefid or Gol-e Sefid or Gel-e Sefid or Gel Safid or Gelsafid, also rendered as Gul-i-Safid, may refer to:
 Gel Sefid, Chaharmahal and Bakhtiari
 Gel-e Sefid, Gilan
 Gol-e Sefid, Ilam
 Gel-e Sefid, Isfahan
 Gel Sefid, Kermanshah
 Gel Sefid, Sonqor, Kermanshah Province
 Gol Sefid, Andika, Khuzestan Province
 Gol Sefid, Chelo, Andika County, Khuzestan Province
 Gol Sefid, Lorestan
 Gel-e Sefid Rural District, in Gilan Province